Donald Clevester Calhoun (April 29, 1952 – December 14, 2020) was an American professional football running back who played for nine seasons in the National Football League (NFL) for the Buffalo Bills, the New England Patriots. and the Philadelphia Eagles.  He later played for the New Jersey Generals of the United States Football League.  

Prior to playing NFL, Calhoun played football at Wichita High School North and Kansas State University. He was drafted in the tenth round of the 1974 NFL Draft by Buffalo. In 2009, he was inducted into both the Wichita Sports Hall of Fame and the Kansas Sports Hall of Fame; and in 2010, was chosen and awarded entry into the Wichita North High School Hall of Fame.

He died on December 14, 2020, at age 68, in Derby, Kansas.

References

1952 births
2020 deaths
People from Noble County, Oklahoma
American football running backs
Kansas State Wildcats football players
Buffalo Bills players
New England Patriots players
Philadelphia Eagles players
New Jersey Generals players